Jansenism was an early modern theological movement within Catholicism, primarily active in the Kingdom of France, that arose in an attempt to reconcile the theological concepts of free will and divine grace. Jansenists claimed to profess the true doctrine of grace as put forth by Augustine of Hippo. In 1653, Pope Innocent X promulgated the bull Cum occasione, which condemned five errors attributed to Janesenism, including the idea that Christ did not die or shed his blood for all men.

The movement originated in the posthumously published work of the Dutch theologian Cornelius Jansen, who died in 1638. It was first popularized by Jansen's friend, Abbot Jean du Vergier de Hauranne of Saint-Cyran-en-Brenne Abbey, and after du Vergier's death in 1643, the movement was led by Antoine Arnauld. Through the 17th and into the 18th centuries, Jansenism was a distinct movement away from the Catholic Church. The theological center of the movement was Port-Royal-des-Champs Abbey, which was a haven for writers including du Vergier, Arnauld, Pierre Nicole, Blaise Pascal, and Jean Racine.

Jansenism was opposed by many within the Catholic hierarchy, especially the Jesuits. Although the Jansenists identified themselves only as rigorous followers of Saint Augustine of Hippo's teachings, Jesuits coined the term Jansenism to identify them as having Calvinist leanings. The apostolic constitution , promulgated by Pope Innocent X in 1653, condemned five cardinal doctrines of Jansenism as heretical, especially the relationship between human free will and efficacious grace, wherein the teachings of Augustine, as presented by the Jansenists, contradicted Jesuit thought. Jansenist leaders endeavored to accommodate the pope's pronouncements while retaining their uniqueness, and enjoyed a measure of peace in the late 17th century under Pope Clement IX. Further controversy led to the papal bull  of Pope Clement XI in 1713, however, which condemned further Jansenist teachings. This controversy did not end until Louis Antoine de Noailles, cardinal and archbishop of Paris who had opposed the bull, signed it in 1728.

Origins

The origins of Jansenism lie in the friendship of Jansen and Duvergier, who met in the early 17th century when both were studying Christian theology at the University of Leuven. Duvergier was Jansen's patron for several years, getting Jansen a job as a tutor in Paris in 1606. Two years later, he got Jansen a position teaching at the bishop's college in Duvergier's hometown of Bayonne. The two studied the Church Fathers together, with a special focus on the thought of Augustine of Hippo, until both left Bayonne in 1617.

Jansen returned to the University of Leuven, where he completed his doctorate in 1619 and was named professor of exegesis. Jansen and Duvergier continued to correspond about Augustine of Hippo, especially in regards to Augustine's teachings on grace. Upon the recommendation of King Philip IV of Spain, Jansen was consecrated as bishop of Ypres in 1636.

Jansen died in a 1638 epidemic. On his deathbed, he committed a manuscript to his chaplain, ordering him to consult with Libert Froidmont, a theology professor at Leuven, and Henricus Calenus, canon at the metropolitan church, and to publish the manuscript if they agreed it should be published, adding "If, however, the Holy See wishes any change, I am an obedient son, and I submit to that Church in which I have lived to my dying hour. This is my last wish."

The book consisted of three volumes:

 The first described the history of Pelagianism and Augustine's battle against it and against Semipelagianism;
 The second discussed the fall of man and original sin;
 The third denounced a "modern tendency" (unnamed by Jansen but clearly identifiable as Molinism) as Semipelagian

Jansenist theology

Jansen emphasized a particular reading of Augustine's idea of efficacious grace that stressed that only a certain portion of humanity was predestined to be saved. Jansen insisted that the love of God was fundamental, and that only perfect contrition, and not imperfect contrition (or attrition) could save a person (and that, in turn, only an efficacious grace could tip that person toward God and such contrition). This debate on the respective roles of contrition and attrition, which had not been settled by the Council of Trent (1545–1563), was one of the motives of the imprisonment in May 1638 of Duvergier, the first leader of Port-Royal, by order of Cardinal Richelieu. Duvergier was not released until after Richelieu's death in 1642, and he died shortly thereafter, in 1643.

Jansen also insisted on justification by faith, although he did not contest the necessity of revering saints, of confession, and of frequent Communion. Jansen's opponents condemned his teachings for their alleged similarities to Calvinism (though, unlike Calvinism, Jansen rejected the doctrine of assurance and taught that even the justified could lose their salvation). Pascal claimed that Molinists were correct concerning the state of humanity before the Fall, while Calvinists were correct regarding the state of humanity after the Fall.

The heresy of Jansenism, as stated by subsequent Roman Catholic doctrine, lay in denying the role of free will in the acceptance and use of grace. Jansenism asserts that God's role in the infusion of grace cannot be resisted and does not require human assent. The Catechism of the Catholic Church states the orthodox position that "God's free initiative demands man's free response"—that is, humans freely assent or refuse God's gift of grace.

Controversy and papal condemnation: 1640–1653

 was widely read in theological circles in France, Belgium, and the Netherlands in 1640, and a new edition quickly appeared in Paris under the approval of ten professors at the College of Sorbonne (the theological college of the University of Paris).

On August 1, 1642, however, the Holy Office issued a decree condemning  and forbidding its reading.

In 1602, Marie Angélique Arnauld became abbess of Port-Royal-des-Champs, a Cistercian convent in Magny-les-Hameaux. There, she reformed discipline after a conversion experience in 1608. In 1634, Duvergier had become the spiritual adviser of Port-Royal-des-Champs and good friend of Angélique Arnauld; he convinced her of the rightness of Jansen's opinions. The two convents thus became major strongholds of Jansenism. Under Angélique Arnauld, later with Duvergier's support, Port-Royal-des-Champs developed a series of elementary schools, known as the "Little Schools of Port-Royal"; the most famous product of these schools was the playwright Jean Racine.

Following Duvergier's death in 1643, Antoine Arnauld became the chief proponent of Jansenism. That same year he published  (On Frequent Communion), which presented Jansen's ideas in a way more accessible to the public (e.g., it was written in the vernacular, whereas  was written in Latin). The book focused on a related topic in the dispute between Jesuits and Jansenists. The Jesuits encouraged Roman Catholics, including those struggling with sin, to receive Holy Communion frequently, arguing that Christ instituted it as a means to holiness for sinners, and stating that the only requirement for receiving Communion (apart from baptism) was that the communicant is free of mortal sin at the time of reception. The Jansenists, in line with their deeply pessimistic theology, discouraged frequent Communion, arguing that a high degree of perfection, including purification from attachment to venial sin, was necessary before approaching the sacrament.

The faculty of the College of Sorbonne formally accepted the papal bull  in 1644, and Cardinal Jean François Paul de Gondi, archbishop of Paris, formally proscribed ; the work nevertheless continued to circulate.

The Jesuits then attacked the Jansenists, charging them with heresy similar to Calvinism.

The Jesuits then designated Nicolas Caussin (former confessor to Louis XIII) to write  ("Response to the libel titled Moral Theology of the Jesuits") in 1644. Pinthereau also wrote a critical history of Jansenism,  ("The Birth of Jansenism Revealed to the Chancellor") in 1654.

During the 1640s, Duvergier's nephew, Martin de Barcos, who was once a theology student under Jansen, wrote several works defending Duvergier.

Before the faculty could do so, the Parliament of Paris intervened and forbade the faculty to consider the propositions. Innocent X agreed to the majority's request, but in an attempt to accommodate the view of the minority, appointed an advisory committee consisting of five cardinals and thirteen consultors to report on the situation. Over the next two years, this commission held 36 meetings including 10 presided by Innocent X.

The supporters of Jansenism on the commission drew up a table with three heads: the first listed the Calvinist position (which were condemned as heretical), the second listed the Pelagian/Semipelagian position (as taught by the Molinists), and the third listed the correct Augustinian position (according to the Jansenists).

Jansenism's supporters suffered a decisive defeat when the apostolic constitution  was promulgated by Innocent X in 1653, which condemned the following five propositions:

 That there are some commands of God that just persons cannot keep, no matter how hard they wish and strive, and they are not given the grace to enable them to keep these commands;
 That it is impossible for fallen persons to resist interior grace;
 That it is possible for human beings who lack free will to merit;
 That the Semipelagians were correct to teach that prevenient grace was necessary for all interior acts, including for faith, but were incorrect to teach that fallen humanity is free to accept or resist prevenient grace; and;
 That it is Semipelagian to say that Christ died for all.

Formulary controversy

Background: 1654–1664

Replying to Arnauld, in 1654, 38 French bishops condemned Arnauld's position to the pope. In response to this onslaught, Arnauld articulated a distinction as to how far the Church could bind the mind of a Catholic. He argued that there is a distinction between de jure and de facto: that a Catholic was obliged to accept the Church's opinion as to a matter of law (i.e., as to a matter of doctrine) but not as to a matter of fact.

In 1656, the theological faculty at the Sorbonne moved against Arnauld. This was the context in which Blaise Pascal wrote his famous  in defense of Arnauld's position in the dispute at the Sorbonne, and denouncing the "relaxed morality" of Jesuitism (Unlike Arnauld, Pascal did not accede to  but believed that the condemned doctrines were orthodox. Nevertheless, he emphasized Arnauld's distinction about matters of doctrine vs. matters of fact.) The Letters were also scathing in their critique of the casuistry of the Jesuits, echoing Arnauld's .

However, Pascal did not convince the Sorbonne's theological faculty, which voted 138–68 to degrade Arnauld together with 60 other theologians from the faculty. Later that year, the French Assembly of the Bishops voted to condemn Arnauld's distinction of the pope's ability to bind the mind of believers in matters of doctrine but not in matters of fact; they asked Pope Alexander VII to condemn Arnauld's proposition as heresy. Alexander VII responded, in the apostolic constitution  promulgated in 1656, that "We declare and define that the five propositions have been drawn from the book of Jansenius entitled , and that they have been condemned in the sense of the same Jansenius and we once more condemn them as such."

In retaliation, Gondi interdicted the convent of Port Royal from receiving the sacraments. In 1660, the elementary schools run by Port-Royal-des-Champs were closed by the bull, and in 1661, the monastery at Port-Royal-des-Champs was forbidden to accept new novices, which guaranteed the convent would eventually die out.

Formulary: 1664
Four bishops sided with Port-Royal, arguing that the Assembly of the French clergy could not command French Catholics to subscribe to something that was not required by the pope.

Formulary controversy: 1664–1669
The Formula of Submission for the Jansenists was the basis of the Formulary Controversy. Many Jansenists refused to sign it; while some did sign, they made it known that they were agreeing only to the doctrine (questions of law de jure), not the allegations asserted by the bull (questions of fact de facto). The latter category included the four Jansenist-leaning bishops, who communicated the bull to their flocks along with messages that maintained the distinction between doctrine and fact. This angered both Louis XIV and Alexander VII. Alexander VII commissioned nine French bishops to investigate the situation.

Alexander VII died in 1667 before the commission concluded its investigation and his successor, Pope Clement IX, initially appeared willing to continue the investigation of the nine Jansenist-leaning bishops. However, in France, Jansenists conducted a campaign arguing that allowing a papal commission of this sort would be ceding the traditional liberties of the Gallican Church, thus playing on traditional French opposition to ultramontanism. They convinced one member of the cabinet (Lyonne) and nineteen bishops of their position, these bishops argued, in a letter to Clement IX, that the infallibility of the Church applied only to matters of revelation, and not to matters of fact. They asserted that this was the position of Caesar Baronius and Robert Bellarmine. They also argued, in a letter to Louis XIV, that allowing the investigation to continue would result in political discord.

Under these circumstances, the papal nuncio to France recommended that Clement IX accommodate the Jansenists. Clement agreed, and appointed César d'Estrées, bishop of Laon, as a mediator in the matter. D'Estrées convinced the four bishops, Arnauld, Choart de Buzenval, Caulet, and Pavillon, to sign the Formula of Submission for the Jansenists (though it seems they may have believed that signing the formulary did not mean assent to the matters of fact it contained). The pope, initially happy that the four bishops had signed, became angry when he was informed that they had done so with reservations. Clement IX ordered his nuncio to conduct a new investigation. Reporting back, the nuncio declared: "they have condemned and caused to be condemned the five propositions with all manner of sincerity, without any exception or restriction whatever, in every sense in which the Church has condemned them". However, he reported that the four bishops continued to be evasive as to whether they agreed with the pope as to the matter of fact. In response, Clement IX appointed a commission of twelve cardinals to further investigate the matter. This commission determined that the four bishops had signed the formula in a less than entirely sincere manner, but recommended that the matter should be dropped to forestall further divisions in the Church. The pope agreed and thus issued four briefs, declaring the four bishops' agreement to the formula was acceptable, thus instituting the "Peace of Clement IX" (1669–1701).

Case of Conscience and aftermath: 1701–1709

Although the Peace of Clement IX was a lull in the public theological controversy, several clergies remained attracted to Jansenism. Three major groups were:

 The , who accepted the doctrine of  but who continued to deny the infallibility of the Church in matters of fact;
 The quasi-Jansenists, who formally accepted both  and the infallibility of the Church in matters of fact, but who nevertheless remained attracted to aspects of Jansenism, notably its stern morality, commitment to virtue, and its opposition to ultramontanism, which was also a political issue in France in the decades surrounding the 1682 Declaration of the clergy of France.

The tensions generated by the continuing presence of these elements in the French church came to a head in the Case of Conscience of 1701. The case involved the question of whether or not absolution should be given to a cleric who refused to affirm the infallibility of the Church in matters of fact (even though he did not preach against it but merely maintained a "respectful silence"). A provincial conference, consisting of forty theology professors from the Sorbonne, headed by Noël Alexandre, declared that the cleric should receive absolution.

The publication of this "Case of Conscience" provoked outrage among the anti-Jansenist elements in the Catholic Church. The decision given by the scholars was condemned by several French bishops; by Cardinal Louis Antoine de Noailles, archbishop of Paris; by the theological faculties at Leuven, Douai, and eventually Paris; and, finally, in 1703, by Pope Clement XI. The scholars who had signed the Case of Conscience now backed away, and all of the signatories withdrew their signatures and the theologian who had championed the result of the Case of Conscience, was expelled from the Sorbonne.

Louis XIV and his grandson, Philip V of Spain, now asked the pope to issue a papal bull condemning the practice of maintaining a respectful silence as to the issue of the infallibility of the Church in matters of the dogmatic fact.

The pope obliged, issuing the apostolic constitution , dated July 16, 1705. At the subsequent Assembly of the French Clergy, all those present, except P.-Jean-Fr. de Percin de Montgaillard, bishop of Saint-Pons, voted to accept  and Louis XIV promulgated it as binding law in France.

Louis also sought the dissolution of Port-Royal-des-Champs, the stronghold of Jansenist thought, and this was achieved in 1708 when the pope issued a bull dissolving Port-Royal-des-Champs. The remaining nuns were forcibly removed in 1709 and dispersed among various other French convents and the buildings were razed in 1709. The convent of Port-Royal Abbey, Paris, remained in existence until it was closed in the general dechristianisation of France during the French Revolution.

Case of Quesnel

Pasquier Quesnel had been a member of the Oratory of Jesus in Paris from 1657 until 1681, when he was expelled for Jansenism. He sought the protection of Pierre du Cambout de Coislin, bishop of Orléans, who harbored Quesnel for four years, at which point Quesnel joined Antoine Arnauld in Brussels, Flanders. In 1692, Quesnel published , a devotional guide to the New Testament that laid out the Jansenist position in strong terms. Following Arnauld's death in 1694, Quesnel was widely regarded as the leader of the Jansenists. In 1703, Quesnel was imprisoned by Humbertus Guilielmus de Precipiano, archbishop of Mechelen, but escaped several months later and lived in Amsterdam for the remainder of his life.

 did not initially arouse controversy; in fact, it was approved for publication by Félix Vialart de Herse, bishop of Châlons-sur-Marne, and recommended by Noailles.

 The result was the apostolic constitution , promulgated by Pope Clement XI on September 8, 1713.

Those Jansenists who accepted  became known as Acceptants.

He, therefore, refused to accept the apostolic constitution and instead sought clarifications from the pope.

In the midst of this dispute, Louis XIV died in 1715, and the government of France was taken over by Philippe II, Duke of Orléans, regent for the five-year-old Louis XV of France. Unlike Louis XIV, who had stood solidly behind , Philippe II expressed ambivalence during the  period. With the change in political mood, three theological faculties that had previously voted to accept  – Paris, Nantes, and Reims – voted to rescind their acceptance.

In 1718, Clement XI responded vigorously to this challenge to his authority by issuing the bull  by which he excommunicated everyone who had called for an appeal to a general council. Far from disarming the French clergy, many of whom were now advocating conciliarism, the clergy who had appealed  to a general council, now appealed  to a general council as well. In total, one cardinal, 18 bishops, and 3,000 clergy of France supported an appeal to a general council. However, the majority of clergy in France (four cardinals, 100 bishops, 100,000 clergymen) stood by the pope. The schism carried on for some time, and it was not until 1728 that Louis Antoine de Noailles submitted to the pope and signed .

Factionalism

Jansenism persisted in France for many years but split "into antagonistic factions" in the late 1720s.

The connection between the larger French Jansenist movement and the smaller, more radical  phenomenon is difficult to state with precision. Brian Strayer noted, in Suffering Saints, almost all  were Jansenists, but very few Jansenists embraced the  phenomenon.

"The format of their seances changed perceptibly after 1732," according to Strayer. The movement descended into brutal cruelties that "clearly had sexual overtones" in their practices of penance and mortification of the flesh. In 1735 the  regained jurisdiction over the convulsionary movement, which changed into an underground movement of clandestine sects. The "Augustinian " were then absconded from Paris to avoid police surveillance. This "further split the Jansenist movement."

According to Strayer, by 1741 the leadership was "dead, exiled, or imprisoned," and the movement was divided into three groups. The police role increased and the  role decreased "in the social control of Jansenism" but cells continued engaging in seances, torture, and apocalyptic and treasonous rhetoric. By 1755 there were fewer than 800  in France. In 1762 the  criminalized some of their practices "as 'potentially dangerous' to human life." The last crucifixion was documented in 1788.

Jansenists continued to publish anti-Jesuit propaganda through their magazine  and played a central role in plotting and promoting the expulsion of the Jesuits from France in 1762–64.

In the Spanish Netherlands and the Dutch Republic

As noted by Jonathan Israel Jansenism initially had strong support in the Spanish Netherlands, where Jansen himself had been active, supported by such major figures of the Church Hierarchy as Jacobus Boon, Archbishop of Mechelen and Antonie Triest, Bishop of Ghent. Though the Church in the Spanish Netherlands eventually took up persecution of Jansenism – with Jansenist clergy being replaced by their opponents and the monument to Jansen in the Cathedral of Ypres being symbolically demolished in 1656 – the Spanish authorities were less zealous in this persecution than the French ones.

Where Jansenism persisted longest as a major force among Catholics was in the Dutch Republic, where Jansenism was actively encouraged and supported by the Republic's authorities. Jansenist refugees from France and the Spanish Netherlands were made welcome, increasing the Jansenist influence among Dutch Catholics. Politically, the Dutch Jansenists were more inclined than other Catholics to reach accommodation with the Protestant authorities and sought to make themselves independent of Papal control. Moreover, theologically the Jansenist doctrines were considered to be closer to the dominant Dutch Calvinism. Indeed, Dutch Jansenism (sometimes called "Quesnelism" after Pasquier Quesnel, who emerged as a major proponent of Jansenism in the 1690s) was accused by its opponents of being "Crypto-Calvinism within the Church". The controversy between Jansenists and anti-Jansenists (the latter naturally led by the Jesuits) increasingly tore up the Dutch Catholic Church in the late 17th and early 18th century – with the authorities of the Dutch Republic actively involved on the one side and the Papacy and Kings of France, Spain, Portugal, and Poland – on the other. Moreover, some Dutch Catholics seeking greater independence from Papal control were identified as being "Jansenists", even if not necessarily adhering to the theological doctrines of Jansenism.

Things came to an open split in April 1723, with the adherents of what would come to be known as the Old Catholic Church breaking away and appointing one of their numbers, the Amsterdammer Cornelis Steenhoven, as Archbishop of Utrecht to rival the Archbishop recognized by the Pope. Throughout the 18th century, these two rival Catholic Churches were active in competition. The question of whether, and to what degree, this breakaway Church was Jansenist was highly controversial – the Jesuits having a clear polemical interest in emphasizing its identification as such.

In the 19th century, Jansenists were part of the abolition societies in France. The Janists had criticized Jesuit missions in the New World and advocated for liberation.

Legacy
 marks the official end of toleration of Jansenism in the Church in France, though quasi-Jansenists would occasionally stir in the following decades. By the mid-18th century, Jansenism proper had totally lost its battle to be a viable theological position within Catholicism. However, certain ideas tinged with Jansenism remained in circulation for much longer; in particular, the Jansenist idea that Holy Communion should be received very infrequently, and that reception required much more than freedom from mortal sin, remained influential until finally condemned by Pope Pius X, who endorsed frequent communion, as long as the communicant was free of mortal sin, in the early 20th century.

In 1677, a pro-Baianism faction from the theological faculty at Louvain submitted 116 propositions of moral laxity for censure to Pope Innocent XI, who selected 65 propositions from the submission and "limited himself to condemning the deviations of moral doctrine." On the other hand,  through the Holy Office, those 65 propositions in 1679, "without naming the probabilism prevalent in Jesuit circles."  All 65 propositions were censured and prohibited "as at least scandalous and pernicious in practice."

Jansenism was a factor in the formation of the independent Old Catholic Church of the Netherlands from 1702 to 1723, and 

In Quebec, Canada, in the 1960s, many people rejected the Church, and many of its institutions were secularized.  For instance, Paul-Emile Borduas' 1948 manifesto  accused the Church in Quebec as being the result of a "Jansenist colony".

See also
 Antoine Le Maistre
 Molinism
 Dale K. Van Kley
 Crypto-Protestantism
 Jean Racine
 Saint-Medard, Paris

Notes

References

Further reading

 Ogg, David. Europe in the 17th Century (8th ed. 1960): 323-364.

 Strayer, E. Brain, Suffering Saints: Jensenits and Convulsionaries in France, 1640–1799 (Eastborne, Sussex Academic Press, 2008)
 Crichton. D. J., Saints or Sinners?: Jansenism and Jansenisers in Seventeenth Century France (Dublin, Veritas Publications, 1996)
 Swann Julian, Politics and the Parliament of Paris under Louis XV 1754–1774 (Cambridge, Cambridge University Press, 1995)
 Doyle William, Jansenism: Catholic Resistance to Authority from the Reformation to the French Revolution: Studies in European History (Basingstoke, Macmillan Press Ltd, 2000)

External links

 Provincial Letters by Blaise Pascal  (1656)

 
17th-century Catholicism
Christian terminology
Heresy in the Catholic Church
Religion in the Ancien Régime
Schisms in Christianity